BigBlueButton is an open source (except for some versions of its database software) virtual classroom application designed for online education. Accessed most commonly through a variety of Learning Management Systems, the application provides engagement tools and analytics for educators to interact with their students remotely, while giving educators access to metrics that display student progress.

History 
In 2007 the project was started at Carleton University by the Technology Innovation Management program.
The first version was written by Richard Alam (it was initially called the Blindside project) under the supervision of Tony Bailetti. BigBlueButton is an affiliate member of the Open Source Initiative. The BigBlueButton name comes from the initial concept that starting a web conference should be as simple as pressing a metaphorical big blue button.

In 2009 Richard Alam, Denis Zgonjanin, and Fred Dixon uploaded the BigBlueButton source code to Google Code and formed Blindside Networks, a company pursuing the traditional open source business model of providing paid support and services to the BigBlueButton community.

In 2010 the core developers added a whiteboard for annotating the uploaded presentation. Jeremy Thomerson added an application programming interface (API) which the BigBlueButton community subsequently used to integrate with Sakai, WordPress,  Moodle 1.9,  Moodle 2.0, Joomla, Redmine, Drupal, Tiki Wiki CMS Groupware, Foswiki, and LAMS. Google accepted BigBlueButton into the 2010 Google Summer of Code program. To encourage contributions from others, the core developers moved the source code from Google Code to GitHub. The project indicated its intent to create an independent, not-for-profit BigBlueButton Foundation to oversee future development.

In 2011, the core developers announced they were adding record and playback capabilities to BigBlueButton 0.80.

In 2020, the project released BigBlueButton 2.2, a full rewrite of the client and server to support HTML5.

In March 2020, BigBlueButton 2.2 was awarded by the President of the ENTD, Pasquale Aiello, as the best web conferencing system and used in the project UNIOPEN approved by the European Commission for Digital Skills and Job Coalition action plan.

In 2021, version 2.3 was released. BigBlueButton continued to depended on MongoDB, which became proprietary in version 3.6 and later, released in 2018. BigBlueButton 2.3 is the first which recommends using a proprietary MongoDB version, but remains compatible with the free software 3.4 MongoDB.

In 2022, BigBlueButton was directly embedded into the Moodle 4.0 core, the largest Learning Management System. It also released two new updates that included BigBlueButton 2.4 in January, and BigBlueButton 2.5 in late September. BigBlueButton continues to be used by organizations that include the Ministry of National Education (France), the Air Education and Training Command, not-for-profits such as School on Wheels, and schools throughout the world for remote learning and teaching.

Features 
BigBlueButton provides educators with a variety of tools for management, relationships, engagement and assessment. Educators can share audio, webcams, slide, and screen sharing between themselves and their students. It allows the educators to use multi-user whiteboards (meaning students can use it simultaneously), breakout rooms, chat (public and private), polling, shared notes, random user selector, and emojis. Version 2.4 provides the instructor with a live dashboard of student attendance, engagement, and learning, which is based on responses to polls. The analytics tools track presence, participation and learning rates of the students. BigBlueButton 2.5. provides further enhancements to its feature-set such as its breakout room (message broadcasting, ease of set-up and modification), whiteboard (anti social-conformity measures that hide students' mouse cursors so they have more agency in their responses), polling (allowing for multiple responses) and more.

Architecture 
As a web page application, BigBlueButton front-end uses React and the backend uses MongoDB and Node.js.  It also uses Redis to maintain an internal list of its meetings, attendees, and any other relevant information. As of version 2.5, the server runs on Ubuntu 20.04 64-bit and can be installed either from packages or install script.

Adoption among non-profits 
In 2020, BBB has been adopted by many FLOSS focused non-profits including Wikimedia Australia, Constant vzw and new FLOSS focused coops like Catalan's The Online Meeting Cooperative. In France it is recommended since May 2020 by the Digital Interministry Direction defining the state's information and communication systems.

Third party integrations 
 Canvas (Learning Management System)
 Chamilo (Learning Management System)
 DoceboLMS (Saas/Cloud Learning Management System)
 Drupal (Content Management System)
 ILIAS (Learning Management System)
 Moodle (Learning Management System)
 Mattermost (Web-based chat service)
 Nextcloud (Open Source cloud solution)
 OpenOLAT (Learning Management System)
 Sakai Project (Learning Management System)
 Tiki Wiki CMS Groupware (Content Management System)
 Qwerteach (Saas / Tutoring platform)
 WordPress (Content Management System)
 KampüsProject (Learning Management System)
 CollaboratorLMS (Learning Management System)
 Smartschool (Web-based school platform)

See also 
 Collaborative software
 Web conferencing
 Comparison of web conferencing software
 Wikiversity:Video conferencing

References

External links 
 

Classroom management software
Cross-platform software
Date-matching software
Free content management systems
Free groupware
Teleconferencing
Virtual learning environments
Web conferencing
WordPress